Mount Blackmore is located in Gallatin National Forest, in the U.S. state of Montana. Bozeman is located near the East Gallatin River, Gallatin County, Mount Blackmore is south of the City of Bozeman in the Gallatin Range.

Ferdinand Vandeveer Hayden's survey expedition of the Yellowstone area named the peak for Mary Blackmore, wife of William Blackmore, an English land speculator and philanthropist who accompanied the Hayden Survey. Mary Blackmore contracted pneumonia and died in Bozeman, Montana during the early summer of 1872.

References

External links
 Mount Blackmore | Outside Bozeman

Mountains of Gallatin County, Montana
Blackmore